Kachap-e Sofla (also Romanized as Kachap-e Soflá; also known as Kachab-e Pā’īn) is a village in Dabuy-ye Jonubi Rural District, Dabudasht District, Amol County, Mazandaran Province, Iran. At the 2006 census, its population was 869, in 230 families.

References 

Populated places in Amol County